Dallington may refer to:
 Dallington, East Sussex
 Dallington, Northamptonshire
 Dallington, New Zealand
 Sir Robert Dallington (1561–1637), English courtier and writer

See also
 Darlington (disambiguation)